Desert Storm is a codename for the Gulf War (1990–1991), a war against Iraq by a U.S.-led coalition, following Iraq's invasion of Kuwait. 

Desert Storm may also refer to:

Dust storm, a meteorological phenomenon that is common in desert regions
Desert Storm (roller coaster), a double looping roller coaster located at Castles N' Coasters, in Phoenix, Arizona
"Desert Storm" (Sliders), an episode of the television series Sliders
Desert Storm Records, an American record label founded in 1998
Operation: Desert Storm (video game), a 1991 top-down tank shooter for the Macintosh
One of two video games in the Conflict series of video games:
Conflict: Desert Storm (2002)
Conflict: Desert Storm II (2003)

See also
Gulf War (disambiguation)
Iraq War (disambiguation)